Tetrops gilvipes is a species of beetle in the family Cerambycidae. It was described by Faldermann in 1837, originally under the genus Anaetia. It has a wide distribution in Europe. It feeds on Pyrus communis.

Subspecies
In 2019 6 Subspzies are known:
 Tetrops gilvipes gilvipes (Faldermann, 1837)
 Tetrops gilvipes adlbaueri Lazarev, 2012
 Tetrops gilvipes efetovi Lazarev, 2012
 Tetrops gilvipes mikati Sláma, 2019
 Tetrops gilvipes murzini Lazarev, 2012
 Tetrops gilvipes niger  Kraatz, 1859

References

Tetropini
Beetles described in 1837